Yu Baiwei (also romanized as Yu Beiwei; born 17 July 1988), also known by the Western name Berry Yu, is a Chinese ice hockey player and captain of the Chinese national team and the Shenzhen KRS in the Zhenskaya Hockey League (ZhHL). A three-time medalist at the Asian Winter Games, she represented China in the women's ice hockey tournament at the 2010 Winter Olympics in Vancouver and in the women's ice hockey tournament at the 2022 Winter Olympics in Beijing. 

Yu previously played for Kunlun Red Star WIH and the Shenzhen KRS Vanke Rays of the now-defunct Canadian Women's Hockey League (CWHL), the Edmonton Chimos of the now-defunct Western Women's Hockey League (WWHL), and in the Naisten SM-sarja with Team China. She signed with the Minnesota Whitecaps of the National Women's Hockey League (NWHL) for the 2019–20 season.

References

External links
 

 
 
 
 

1988 births
Living people
Asian Games bronze medalists for China
Asian Games medalists in ice hockey
Asian Games silver medalists for China
Chinese women's ice hockey defencemen
Edmonton Chimos players
Ice hockey players at the 2007 Asian Winter Games
Ice hockey players at the 2011 Asian Winter Games
Ice hockey players at the 2017 Asian Winter Games
Ice hockey players at the 2010 Winter Olympics
Ice hockey players at the 2022 Winter Olympics
Medalists at the 2007 Asian Winter Games
Medalists at the 2011 Asian Winter Games
Medalists at the 2017 Asian Winter Games
Naisten Liiga (ice hockey) players
Olympic ice hockey players of China
Shenzhen KRS Vanke Rays players
Sportspeople from Harbin